A game time card (GTC, also called game time code) generally refers to a type of voucher that allows a player subscription time to a certain online video game, usually a massively multiplayer online role playing game (MMORPG). These are an alternative to the normal subscription method of cyclical billing that most games offer. The game time card is usually comparable in cost and exchangeable as a gift.

The term now often simply refers to any one-use code for an online game. Some other uses include upgraded subscription cards, new account codes, and codes that can be redeemed for in-game currency. Some video game companies allow players to spend the purchased game time on any title in their collection, or divide it among multiple games.

EVE Online allows players to buy game time cards with in-game currency, letting players who cannot afford subscriptions to buy their game time from others who want to quickly gain in-game currency.

Notes

Role-playing game terminology